Kedestes is a genus of skippers in the family Hesperiidae, commonly known as rangers. The genus is restricted to the Afrotropical realm, where it occurs mostly in the East and South. The larvae of several species feed on grasses. It is thought to be related to Ampittia.

Species
Kedestes brunneostriga (Plötz, 1884)
Kedestes lema Neave, 1910
Kedestes lenis Riley, 1932
Kedestes lepenula (Wallengren, 1857)
Kedestes macomo (Trimen, 1862)
Kedestes malua Neave, 1910
Kedestes marshalli Aurivillius, 1925
Kedestes niveostriga (Trimen, 1864)
Kedestes rogersi Druce, 1907
Kedestes straeleni Evans, 1956
Kedestes sublineata Pennington, 1953

Former species
Kedestes barberae (Trimen, 1873) - transferred to Trida barberae (Trimen, 1873)
Kedestes callicles (Hewitson, 1868) - transferred to Dotta callicles (Hewitson, 1868)
Kedestes chaca (Trimen, 1873) - transferred to Nervia chaca (Trimen, 1873)
Kedestes ekouyi Vande weghe and Albert, 2009 - transferred to Nervia ekouyi (Vande weghe and Albert, 2009)
Kedestes heathi Hancock & Gardiner, 1982 - transferred to Nervia heathi (Hancock & Gardiner, 1982)
Kedestes michaeli Gardiner & Hancock, 1982 - transferred to Nervia michaeli (Gardiner & Hancock, 1982)
Kedestes monostichus Hancock & Gardiner, 1982 - transferred to Nervia monostichus (Hancock & Gardiner, 1982)
Kedestes mohozutza (Wallengren, 1857) - transferred to Nervia mohozutza (Wallengren, 1857)
Kedestes nancy Collins & Larsen, 1991 - transferred to Nervia nancy (Collins & Larsen, 1991)
Kedestes nerva (Fabricius, 1793) - transferred to Nervia nerva (Fabricius, 1793))
Kedestes pinheyi Hancock & Gardiner, 1982 - transferred to Nervia pinheyi (Hancock & Gardiner, 1982)
Kedestes protensa Butler, 1901 - transferred to Nervia protensa (Butler, 1901)
Kedestes sarahae Henning & Henning, 1998 - transferred to Trida sarahae (Henning & Henning, 1998)
Kedestes wallengrenii (Trimen, 1883) - transferred to Nervia wallengrenii (Trimen, 1883)

References

Natural History Museum Lepidoptera genus database

External links
Kedestes at funet
 Seitz, A. Die Gross-Schmetterlinge der Erde 13: Die Afrikanischen Tagfalter. Plate XIII 78

 
Hesperiidae genera